Universal Concepts Unlimited (UCU) was a pioneering art gallery in Chelsea, Manhattan, New York City that investigated the artistic merit of new technologies based on the emerging digital art scene. UCU existed between the years 2000 and 2006. It was owned and run by Wolf-Dieter Stoeffelmeier and Marian Ziola.

History 
Universal Concepts Unlimited opened its doors at 507 West 24th Street in New York. The inaugural group exhibition, called ROUNDERS, opened on January 15, 2000.

UCU sought to introduce crucial issues of art and technology to the larger globalized public as well as the local intellectual community. Thus, UCU featured the work of artists working in digital art: digital painting, digital sculpture, digital photography, video art and installation art. Their goal was to pursue an exploration in visual art as tied to experimental science and technology.

In addition to generating exhibitions, UCU hosted panel discussions and lectures by leading artists, critics, historians, philosophers and scientists in both its Chelsea space and on the web. These adjunct activities served to illustrate and amplify the gallery's objectives.

In 2006, Wolf-Dieter Stoeffelmeier and Marian Ziola separated and the gallery closed.

Artists represented
Rebecca Allen
Suzanne Anker
Christopher Hart Chambers
Frank Gillette
Matthias Groebel 
Ingo Gunther
Gerald Janssen
Steve Miller 
Joseph Nechvatal
Doreen McCarthy
Michael Rees
Bradley Rubenstein 
Andrew Topolski
Michael Zansky

See also
 Post-convergent
 Neo-conceptual art
 Postminimalism
 Virtual art
 Conceptual art
 Postmodern art
 Post-conceptual art
 Computer art
 Internet art
 Electronic art
 Systems art
 Cyberarts
 New Media Art
 Generative art

References

Art galleries established in 2000
Chelsea, Manhattan
Defunct art museums and galleries in Manhattan
2000 establishments in New York City
American art dealers
Modern art
Contemporary art galleries in the United States